Ekaterina Avkhimovich (born 2 January 1988) is a Belarusian football striker currently playing for Bobruichanka in the Belarusian Premier League. She previously played in the Russian Championship for Ryazan VDV and in the Belarusian Premier League for FC Minsk and Zorka-BDU Minsk, with both she also played the Champions League.

She is a member of the Belarusian national team.

References

1988 births
Living people
Belarusian women's footballers
Ryazan-VDV players
Expatriate women's footballers in Russia
FC Minsk (women) players
Women's association football forwards
Belarus women's international footballers
Bobruichanka Bobruisk players